Okorsh Saddle (‘Sedlovina Okorsh’ \se-dlo-vi-'na o-'korsh\) is the rocky saddle of elevation 1133 m on Oscar II Coast in Graham Land linking Foster Plateau to the north to Ivanili Heights to the south.  It is part of the glacial divide between Brenitsa Glacier and Rogosh Glacier.  The feature is named after the settlement of Okorsh in Northeastern Bulgaria.

Location
British mapping in 1978.

Maps
 British Antarctic Territory.  Scale 1:200000 topographic map.  DOS 610 Series, Sheet W 64 60.  Directorate of Overseas Surveys, Tolworth, UK, 1978.
 Antarctic Digital Database (ADD). Scale 1:250000 topographic map of Antarctica. Scientific Committee on Antarctic Research (SCAR). Since 1993, regularly upgraded and updated.

Notes

References
 Okorsh Saddle. SCAR Composite Antarctic Gazetteer.
 Bulgarian Antarctic Gazetteer. Antarctic Place-names Commission. (details in Bulgarian, basic data in English)

External links
 Okorsh Saddle. Copernix satellite image

Oscar II Coast
Bulgaria and the Antarctic